The 1999–2000 Divizia A was the eighty-second season of Divizia A, the top-level football league of Romania.

Teams

League table

Positions by round

Results

Top goalscorers

Champion squad

References

Liga I seasons
Romania
1999–2000 in Romanian football